Chhattisgarh, a state of India, has 33 administrative districts. At the time of separation from Madhya Pradesh, Chhattisgarh originally had 16 districts. Two new districts: Bijapur and Narayanpur were carved out on May 11, 2007 and nine new districts on Jan 1, 2012. The new districts have been created by carving out the existing districts to facilitate more targeted, focused and closer administration. These districts have been named Sukma, Kondagaon, Balod, Bemetara, Baloda Bazar, Gariaband, Mungeli, Surajpur and Balrampur The district of Gaurela-Pendra-Marwahi, was inaugurated on 10 February 2020. In September 2022, five new districts were inaugurated: Manpur-Mohla on the 2nd September, Sarangarh-Bilaigarh on the 3rd September, and Manendragarh and Sakti districts on the 9th September. Newly district Khairagarh-Chhuikhadan-Gandai announced on 17 April 2022 and Inaugurated on 3rd September 2022

Background
A district of an Indian state is an administrative geographical unit, headed by a district magistrate or a deputy commissioner, an officer belonging to the Indian Administrative Service. The district magistrate or the deputy commissioner is assisted by a number of officials belonging to different wings of the administrative services of the state.

A superintendent of police, an officer belonging to Indian Police Service, is entrusted with the responsibility of maintaining law and order and related issues.

Administrative history
Before Indian independence, present-day Chhattisgarh state was divided between the Central Provinces and Berar, a province of British India, and a number of princely states in the north, south, and east, which were part of the Eastern States Agency.

The British province encompassed the central portion of the state, and was made up of three districts, Raipur, Bilaspur, and Durg, which made up the Chhattisgarh Division of the Central Provinces. Durg District was created in 1906 out of the western portion of Raipur District.

The northern portion of the state, comprising present-day Koriya, Surajpur, Surguja, Jashpur, and Raigarh districts, was divided among the six princely states of Chang Bhakar, Jashpur, Koriya, Surajpur, Raigarh, Surguja, and Udaipur. To the west, the states of Nandgaon, Khairagarh, and Kawardha comprised parts of present-day Rajnandgaon and Kawardha districts. In the south, the state of Kanker comprised the northern portion of present-day Kanker District, and the state of Bastar included present-day Bastar and Dantewada districts and the southern part of Kanker District.

After Indian Independence, the princely states were merged with the Central Provinces and Berar to form the new state of Madhya Pradesh. Present-day Chhattisgarh comprised seven districts of Madhya Pradesh. The former states of Kanker and Bastar formed the new Bastar District, the parts of Surguja, Korea, and Chang Bhakar formed the new Surguja District, and the states of Nandgaon, Khairagarh, and Kawardha formed the new Rajnandgaon District.

In 1998, the seven districts that make up present-day Chhattisgarh were reorganized to form 16 districts. Dantewada and Kanker districts were split from Bastar; Dhamtari District was split from Raipur; Janjgir-Champa and Korba districts were split from Bilaspur; Jashpur District was split from Raigarh; Kawardha District was formed from parts of Bilaspur and Rajnandgaon; Koriya and Surajpur District was split from Surguja; and Mahasamund District was split from Raipur.

On 1 November 2000, these 16 districts were split from Madhya Pradesh to form the new state of Chhattisgarh. Two new districts were added afterwards. On 1 January 2012, the Chhattisgarh government announced 9 new districts, for a total of 27. On 15 August 2019, the Chhattisgarh chief minister announced the creation of Chhattisgarh's 28th district, Gaurela-Pendra-Marwahi, which would be carved out of Bilaspur district. On 10 February 2020, the new district was inaugurated.

Districts of Chhattisgarh
Chhattisgarh consists of 33 districts.

Districts grouped by divisions
Divisions listed north to south and east to west, and within divisions the districts have been listed clockwise starting from northwest.

Surguja Division
 Balrampur-Ramanujganj
 Jashpur
 Koriya
 Manendragarh district
 Surajpur
 Surguja

Bilaspur Division
 Bilaspur
 Gaurella-Pendra-Marwahi district
 Janjgir-Champa
 Korba
 Mungeli
 Raigarh
 Sakti
 Sarangarh-Bilaigarh

Durg Division
 Balod
 Bemetara
 Durg
 Kabirdham (Kawardha)
 Khairagarh-Chhuikhadan-Gandai
 Mohla-Manpur-Ambagarh Chowki
 Rajnandgaon

Raipur Division
 Baloda Bazar
 Dhamtari
 Gariaband
 Mahasamund
 Raipur

Bastar Division
 Bastar
 Bijapur
 Dantewada (Dakshin Bastar)
 Kanker (Uttar Bastar)
 Kondagaon
 Narayanpur
 Sukma

Districts with their major cities

See also
 List of districts in India

References

Further reading

External links
 Districts of Chhattisgarh
 Chhattisgarh Photos, Videos, Maps and Tourism
 List of Chhattisgarh District Centres at Chhattisgarh Official Portal.
 List of District official websites

Districts
Chhattisgarh